Vicki Delany (born Victoria Ann Cargo; 1951 in Winnipeg, Manitoba) is a Canadian mystery novelist.  She is the author of nine mystery series, and a member of Crime Writers of Canada and Capital Crime Writers. Delany is a frequent panelist at mystery conferences such as Bouchercon and Malice Domestic in the United States and Bloody Words National Mystery Conference in Canada.

Biography
Delany was employed by the Royal Bank of Canada as a computer programmer and systems analyst until retiring in 2007. She now lives in Prince Edward County, Ontario. She is the mother of three daughters (Caroline, Julia and Alex).

Delany is the author of the Constable Molly Smith mystery series, set in the fictional British Columbia town of Trafalgar (a thinly disguised Nelson, BC), and the Klondike Mystery series, set in Dawson City, Yukon during the Gold Rush of 1898. She is also the author of three novels of psychological suspense, set in Northern Ontario.

Critical response
Scare the Light Away was the subject of a mixed review by Kirkus Reviews, which praised Delany's ability to create a tense atmosphere but felt that the mystery elements of the story were not as effective.

In the Shadow of the Glacier was described as "an intriguing series opener" by Publishers Weekly, which noted that Delany positioned the narrative well to continue into future works.
 
Valley of the Lost drew both praise and criticism from Kirkus Reviews, which described the novel's protagonists as "interesting" and the first three-quarters of the novel as "ingratiating", but then cited "exceptionally silly plotting" that sabotaged the book's ending.

Gold Digger received positive reviews from several publications. Writing for The Globe and Mail, Margaret Cannon noted a few anachronistic touches, but praised the novel's "great setting" and described it as "a lot of fun". In a review published in The Hamilton Spectator, Don Graves lauded the novel as "a captivating tale with lots of colour, ably researched detail and crisp dialogue that moves the story along, spinning into a satisfying, yet surprising, conclusion."

Winter of Secrets was criticized harshly by Kirkus Reviews, which described the novel as "a misstep" and blamed "lumpy prose and [a] none-too-serviceable plot".

Works

A Catskill Summer Resort Mystery

Deadly Summer Night (2021)

Tea by the Sea Mysteries 

Tea and Treachery (2020) 
Murder in a Teacup (2021)

Lighthouse Library series (as Eva Gates)

By Book or By Crook (2015) 
Booked for Trouble (2015) 
Reading Up a Storm (2016) 
The Spook in the Stacks (2018) 
Something Read, Something Dead (2019) 
Read and Buried (2019) 
A Death Long Overdue (2020) 
Deadly Ever After (2021)

Year-Round Christmas Mystery series

Rest Ye Murdered Gentlemen (2015) 
We Wish You A Murderous Christmas (2016) 
Hark the Herald Angels Slay (2017) 
Silent Night, Deadly Night (2019) 
Dying in a Winter Wonderland (2020)

The Sherlock Holmes Bookshop series

Elementary, She Read (2017) 
Body on Baker Street (2017) 
The Cat of the Baskervilles (2018) 
A Scandal in Scarlet (2018) 
There’s a Murder Afoot (2020) 
A Curious Incident (2021) 
A Three Book Problem (2022) 

Ashley Grant Mystery seriesWhite Sand Blues (2017) Blue Water Hues (2018) Coral Reef Views (2020) 

Constable Molly Smith and Winters seriesIn the Shadow of the Glacier (2007) Valley of the Lost (2009) Winter of Secrets (2009) Negative Image (2010) Among the Departed (2011) A Cold White Sun (2013) Under Cold Stone (2014) Unreasonable Doubt (2016) 

Ray Robertson seriesJuba Good (2014) Haitian Graves (2015) Blood and Belonging (2017) 

Klondike Mystery seriesGold Digger (2009) Gold Fever (2010) Gold Mountain (2012) Gold Web (2013) 

Psychological suspense standalones

 White Out (2002) 
 Scare the Light Away (2005) 
 Burden of Memory (2006) 
 More Than Sorrow'' (2012)

References

External links 
 Official Website
 Crime Writers of Canada
 Author Vicki Delany profile page - Capital Crime Writers

Canadian mystery writers
Canadian historical novelists
Canadian women novelists
Living people
Writers from Ontario
People from Oakville, Ontario
1951 births
Women mystery writers
Writers from Winnipeg
21st-century Canadian novelists
21st-century Canadian women writers
Women historical novelists